Theodoor van Loon (1581 or 1582, in Erkelenz – 1649, in Maastricht) was a Flemish Baroque painter.

Life
Theodoor van Loon traveled twice to Italy, from 1602 to 1608 and from 1628 to 1629. He is known as a follower of Caravaggio.

Together with Wenzel Coebergher he completed commissions for Albert VII, Archduke of Austria and his wife Infanta Isabella Clara Eugenia of Spain. He also completed commissions for churches in the region of Brussels, and made an altarpiece for the Basilica of Our Lady of Scherpenheuvel (Mariataferelen, 1623–28).

He was friends with Erycius Puteanus, a professor from the University of Leuven.

According to Houbraken, his paintings show that he spent his training in Italy.

Works

References

External links
Nieuwe gegevens over de 17e eeuwse Zuid-Nederlandse schilder Theodorus van Loon

1580s births
1649 deaths
Flemish Baroque painters
People from Erkelenz